Gradska Plaža Stadium is a multi-purpose stadium in Struga, North Macedonia. It has a capacity of about 800 and it is currently the home ground of FK Karaorman and FC Struga.

References

External links
Macedonian Football 
Football Federation of Macedonia 

Football venues in North Macedonia
Struga